Tijuana Makes Me Happy is a 2007 film made in Tijuana, Mexico.  It was directed by Dylan Verrechia, co-written by James Lefkowitz, with original music by Nortec Collective, and titled by writer Rafael Saavedra. Variety described it as "slight but likable".

The movie has not yet had a general release , but has been screened at several movie festivals  and won the Grand Jury Prize for Best Narrative Feature at the 2007 Slamdance Film Festival, and is one of the four recipients of the 2007 SAFILM Indie Max Award .

Synopsis 
Indio is a fourteen-year-old-boy who lives in Playas de Tijuana. Every day after school, Indio works at Sacramento's ranch in the hopes of buying his own cockfighting rooster, el Gyro. When his dad refuses to help him buy the rooster, Indio starts selling empanadas and washing cars. One day, after he skips school to play with his friends, Indio meets Brianda, a young prostitute working in the red light district. As time passes, Indio learns what it means to make money, a tough journey that takes him cross the border, from Montes Olímpicos to San Diego. Greed however takes the best of Indio; neglecting his rooster, he fights el Gyro to win over the love of Brianda.

References

External links 

Tijuana Makes Me Happy official site
Tijuana Makes Me Happy at slamdance.com
 The New York Times

2007 comedy-drama films
Mexican comedy-drama films
2000s Spanish-language films
2007 films
Cockfighting in film
2000s Mexican films